Kurthia huakuii is a Gram-positive, facultatively anaerobic, spore-forming, short rod-shaped and motile bacterium from the genus of Kurthia which has been isolated from biogas slurry from the Hebei Province in China.

References

Bacillota
Bacteria described in 2014